A general election was held in the U.S. state of New Jersey on November 7, 2017. Primary elections were held on June 6. All elected offices at the state level were on the ballot in this election cycle, including Governor and Lieutenant Governor for four-year terms, all 80 seats in the New Jersey General Assembly for two-year terms, and all 40 seats in the State Senate for four-year terms. In addition to the gubernatorial and State Legislative elections, numerous county offices and Freeholders in addition to municipal offices were up for election. There were two statewide ballot questions and some counties and municipalities also had a local ballot question. Non-partisan local elections, some school board elections, and some fire district elections were also held throughout the year.

Governor

State Senate

All 40 seats of the New Jersey Senate were up for election. Prior to the elections, Democrats held a 24–16 majority in the upper house. Democrats picked up an open seat in District 7 and defeated a Republican incumbent in District 11, while Republicans defeated an appointed Democratic incumbent in District 2. Overall, this resulted in Democrats having a net gain of one seat, increasing their majority to 25–15.

Overall results

General Assembly

All 80 seats of the New Jersey General Assembly were up for election. Prior to the elections, Democrats held a 52–28 majority in the lower house. Overall, the Democrats increased their majority by 2 to a supermajority at 54–26, thanks to holding all their seats as well as picking up open seats in District 2 and District 16.

Overall results

Ballot measures
Two statewide questions were on the ballot. Both were approved by voters:
 Public Question Number 1, a bond measure that would borrow $125 million to fund capital projects for public libraries.
 Public Question Number 2, a constitutional amendment that would require money collected from environmental contamination lawsuits to be used for cleanup and restoration efforts.

Polling
Question 1

Question 2

Results
Question 1

Question 2

References

 
New Jersey